Hindsight is the eighth studio album by American metalcore band Emmure.  The work was released on 26 June 2020 by SharpTone Records.

Background 
Vocalist Frankie Palmeri confirmed in August 2019 that the ensemble had entered the studio to record their eighth album.  On 31 October 2019, the group released "Pigs Ear", the first single from the album, and tweeted "HINDSIGHT IS 2020". In March 2020, they published "Gypsy Disco", the second single from the work.  They again posted "HINDSIGHT IS 2020" on Twitter.

On the one year anniversary of Hindsight's release (June 26, 2021), the band premiered "Sons Of Medusa" an unused track from the Hindsight recording sessions initially slated to be the opener of the album.

Track listing

References 

2020 albums
Emmure albums
SharpTone Records albums